Gringas (plural and feminine form of gringo) are a variety of tacos which consist of flour tortillas filled with cheese, al pastor meat, and pineapple. They are then grilled in the same manner as a quesadilla. Some attribute the name to the use of white flour tortillas.

References

Mexican cuisine
Tortilla-based dishes
Pork dishes
Mexican pork dishes